Irmelin is an opera in three acts with music by Frederick Delius. Composed between 1890 and 1892, it was the first opera which he finished. But it wasn't premiered until 1953, nearly twenty years after his death. The libretto was by the composer, and weaves together two mythical stories. Philip Heseltine described the opera as a "fairy-tale of quite ordinary kind" and "its form dramatically rather below the level of the conventional operatic text. Though the music was much praised by Grieg and Messager... its performance was never seriously contemplated by the composer". Delius had however assimilated Wagnerian influence in his music, with use of key motifs and a sense of flow through the three acts.

Performance history
Sir Thomas Beecham directed the British premiere at the New Theatre Oxford on 4 May 1953; the costumes were by Beatrice Dawson and choreography by Pauline Grant. Beecham's advocacy of the score and "care with which he realizes each detail, the beauty of sound he elicits from his orchestra", were praised by the Opera critic, along with Dennis Arundell's production.

Florent Schmitt arranged the piano scores of Delius's first two operas, Irmelin and The Magic Fountain, but the first full Irmelin score was a vocal score compiled by Dennis Arundell in 1953.

Roles

Synopsis

Act 1
Irmelin's room in the royal castle : A voice in the air counsels the Princess Irmelin on the man she should fall in love with. The king introduces and she refuses three suitors: one old, but rich and devoted, another young and handsome, and the third middle-aged, rich but disagreeable (to whom she is betrothed in act 3).

Act 2
Scene 1 – a forest swamp : Nils is in despair since he lost the Silver Stream which would lead him to his dream princess. Rolf, a robber chief, calls him to his stronghold and made him a swineherd. There is a storm.

Scene 2 – a hall in the stronghold of Rolf : We meet Rolf's followers, men and women carousing and Rolf declares that he will woo the princess. Nils refuses to sing for the assembly as he wants to quest for the Silver Stream.

Scene 3 – in the mountains : As Nils comes to the Silver Stream, wood-nymphs entice him but he is resolute to continue his rocky way.

Act 3
Scene 1 – a hall in the castle : Six months later, as her deadline to wed approaches, Irmelin still hopes that her prince will arrive. Nils enters but when he sings of his life as a swine herd he is dismissed to the servants hall. By night he returns to Irmelin's balcony and they declare their love.

Scene 2 – outside the castle : They wander off to the forest as the castle vanishes.

Recording
There is one complete recording of Irmelin.
 BBC Artium (1985): Eilene Hannan (Irmelin), Ann Howard (Maid), John Mitchinson (Nils), Michael Rippon (King), Brian Rayner Cook (Rolf); BBC Singers and Concert Orchestra conducted by Norman Del Mar. Recording from a broadcast on BBC Radio 3, 18 December 1984.

A performance of an Irmelin, Orchestral Suite (arr. Thomas Beecham) at the Henry Wood Promenade Concert given by the Royal Philharmonic Orhcestra under Beecham on 16 September 1954 at the Royal Albert Hall was issued on CD on the BBC Legends label in 2001.

The Irmelin Prelude was dictated by Delius to Eric Fenby in 1930; not the original prelude to the opera, it is an orchestral miniature which uses themes from the opera (published in 1938). It has been recorded by, among others:
National Symphony Orchestra, Sidney Beer (1944)
Royal Philharmonic Orchestra, Thomas Beecham (1946)
Cleveland Orchestra, George Szell (1957)
Hallé Orchestra, John Barbirolli (1957)
London Symphony Orchestra, John Barbirolli (1966)
BBC Concert Orchestra, Ashley Lawrence (1974)
Bournemouth Sinfonietta, Norman Del Mar (1977)
London Philharmonic Orchestra, Vernon Handley (1979)
Welsh National Opera Orchestra, Charles Mackerras (1992)
New Zealand Symphony Orchestra, Myer Fredman (1995)

References

Operas by Frederick Delius
Operas
1892 operas
English-language operas